Royal LePage Place, is a 1500-seat multi-purpose arena in West Kelowna, British Columbia, Canada.  It was completed in 2007.
Royal LePage Place is the home of the West Kelowna Warriors ice hockey team.  It has a maximum capacity of 1520 plus standing room.  It is located at the foot of Mount Boucherie, next to Jim Lind Arena, Mount Boucherie Secondary School and the District of West Kelowna offices in the Mt. Boucherie Community Centre.  Royal LePage Place will also be used for many other events including concerts, trade shows, and various community gatherings. Royal LePage Place was used as a muster point during the 2009 Glenrosa Forest Fire.

References

External links 
 Home of the Westside Warriors

Indoor arenas in British Columbia
Indoor ice hockey venues in Canada
British Columbia Hockey League arenas
Music venues in British Columbia
Tourist attractions in the Okanagan
West Kelowna